Nangka may refer to:
Jackfruit
Nangka (state constituency), represented in the Sarawak State Legislative Assembly
Typhoon Nangka, a name used for tropical cyclones in the northwestern Pacific Ocean